Floresca is a genus of jellyfish in the family Ulmaridae It is monotypic with the type species Floresca parthenia.

References

Ulmaridae
Animals described in 1880
Monotypic cnidarian genera
Scyphozoan genera